Midway is an unincorporated community in Albemarle County, Virginia. It lies at an elevation of 705 feet (215 m).

References

Unincorporated communities in Albemarle County, Virginia
Unincorporated communities in Virginia